Dually may refer to:

Dualla, County Tipperary, a village in Ireland
A pickup truck with dual wheels on the rear axle
DUALLy, s platform for architectural languages interoperability
Dual-processor

See also 
 Dual (disambiguation)